Ajdovščina City Stadium is a stadium in Ajdovščina, Slovenia. It is used mostly for football matches.

The stadium was closed and under construction in the 2009–10 season. After renovation the capacity of the stadium is 1,630 seats. It was reopened on 5 September 2010.

See also
List of football stadiums in Slovenia

References

Football venues in Slovenia
Multi-purpose stadiums in Slovenia
Sports venues completed in 1929
Sports venues in the Slovene Littoral
20th-century architecture in Slovenia